Aurelio Caicedo Ayerbe (4 May 1921 – 23 July 1998) was a Colombian lawyer and diplomat. He served as the 14th Permanent Representative of Colombia to the United Nations and as Ambassador of Colombia to the Holy See.

Personal life
In 1955, while serving as Minister of National Education, Caicedo married the former Miss Colombia 1953, Luz Marina Cruz Lozada, in the city of Cali. Together they had three children: Pablo, Andrés, and Santiago.

References

1921 births
1998 deaths
People from Cauca Department
University of Cauca alumni
20th-century Colombian lawyers
Colombian Ministers of Labour
Colombian Ministers of National Education
Members of the Chamber of Representatives of Colombia
Members of the Senate of Colombia
Permanent Representatives of Colombia to the United Nations
Ambassadors of Colombia to the Holy See
20th-century American lawyers